Abbihal may refer to several places in India:

 Abbihal, Belgaum, Karnataka
 Abbihal, Basavana Bagevadi, Bijapur District, Karnataka
 Abbihal, Muddebihal, Bijapur District, Karnataka